Spring in Moscow is a 1953 Soviet musical film directed by Iosif Kheifits and Nadezhda Kosheverova and starring Galina Korotkevich,  Vladimir Petrov and Yuri Bublikov. It was based on the first Soviet musical theatre, written by Viktor Gusev and first staged by the New Theatre in Leningrad under Nikolay Akimov.

Cast
 Galina Korotkevich as Nadezhda 
 Vladimir Petrov as Mikhail  
 Yuri Bublikov as Yasha  
 Anatoliy Kuznetsov as Ivan  
 Vladimir Taskin as Akademik Aleksandr Petrov / old Rybkin  
 Leo Shostak as Zdobnov, docent  
 Lyudmila Ponomaryova as Kaya, daughter Rybnik 
 Anatoli Abramov as Commandant of the hostel  
 G. Anchits  
 Aleksandra Trishko as Aunt Masha 
 Agniya Elekoeva as Girl  
 Nikolay Lukinov as Militiaman

References

Bibliography 
 Nina Hibbin. Eastern Europe: an illustrated guide. A. Zwemmer, 1969.

External links 
 

1953 films
1950s musical drama films
Soviet musical drama films
Russian musical drama films
1950s Russian-language films
Films directed by Iosif Kheifits
1953 drama films
Soviet black-and-white films
Films directed by Nadezhda Kosheverova